Jurumleri is a village in the municipality of Gazi Baba, North Macedonia. It is located 15 km. southeast of Skopje.

Demographics
According to the 2021 census, the village had a total of 3.256 inhabitants. Ethnic groups in the village include:
Macedonians 2,522
Romani 342 
Persons for whom data are taken from administrative sources 254
Serbs 62
Albanians 54
Vlachs 7
Others 269

References

Villages in Gazi Baba Municipality